Silvi Antarini (born 26 January 1984) is a former Indonesian badminton player from Jaya Raya Jakarta club. She was part of the Indonesia junior team that won the bronze medal at the 2001 Asian Junior Championships, and also clinched the bronze medal in the girls' singles event. In the senior event, she competed at the 2003 Southeast Asian Games, winning the bronze medal in the women's team event. Antarini was the silver medalist at the 2003 Asian Championships in the women's singles event.

Achievements

Asian Championships 
Women's singles

Asian Junior Championships 
Girls' singles

IBF International 
Women's singles

References

External links 
 

1984 births
Living people
Sportspeople from Jakarta
Indonesian female badminton players
Competitors at the 2003 Southeast Asian Games
Southeast Asian Games bronze medalists for Indonesia
Southeast Asian Games medalists in badminton
21st-century Indonesian women
20th-century Indonesian women